Elderville may refer to:
Elderville, Illinois, an unincorporated community in Hancock County, Illinois
Elderville, Texas, an unincorporated community in Gregg County, Texas